Alksnaitis is a lake in the Ignalina district, eastern Lithuania. The lake connects with Alksnas, Ūkojas and Linkmenas lakes.

Sources

Ignalina District Municipality
Alksnaitis